Robert Eric "Pete" Williams (born July 7, 1963) is an American retired professional basketball player. He played for the Denver Nuggets in the National Basketball Association (NBA) from 1985 to 1987. He played college basketball at the University of Arizona from 1983 to 1985.  Following his stint in the NBA, Williams played professionally in Turkey and Japan.

He was inducted into the Pac-10 Basketball Hall of Honor in 2005.

References

External links
Turkish League Profile

1963 births
Living people
American expatriate basketball people in Japan
American expatriate basketball people in Turkey
American men's basketball players
Arizona Wildcats men's basketball players
Basketball players from California
Denver Nuggets draft picks
Denver Nuggets players
Fenerbahçe men's basketball players
Galatasaray S.K. (men's basketball) players
Mt. SAC Mounties men's basketball players
People from Harbor City, Los Angeles
Power forwards (basketball)
Tofaş S.K. players
Ülker G.S.K. basketball players